Making Music is the fourth studio album by American soul singer-songwriter and producer Bill Withers, released in 1975. It was also released in the UK as Making Friends.

Reception

Making Music was released in 1975 and is Withers' first album on Columbia Records due to  Sussex Records folding in July 1975. The album charted at number seven on the R&B album charts.
The album was released in the UK by CBS under the title of 'Making Friends' also in 1975.

Track listing
All songs written by Bill Withers; except where noted.

"I Wish You Well" - 3:57 	
"The Best You Can" (Withers, Benorce Blackmon) - 2:33 	
"Make Love to Your Mind" - 6:23 	
"I Love You Dawn" - 2:36 	
"She's Lonely" - 5:15 	
"Sometimes a Song" (Withers, Raymond Jackson) - 4:44 	
"Paint Your Pretty Picture" - 5:43 	
"Family Table" (Withers, Diane Gonneau) - 3:13 	
"Don't You Want to Stay?" (Withers, Melvin Dunlap, Raymond Jackson) - 4:03 	
"Hello Like Before" (Withers, John Collins) - 5:29

Personnel
 Bill Withers – lead and backing vocals, acoustic guitar
 Dennis Budimir – acoustic guitar
 George Johnson – electric guitar 
 Ray Parker Jr. – electric guitar
 David T. Walker – electric guitar
 Wah-Wah Watson – electric guitar, guitar effects
 Larry Nash – keyboards, ARP synthesizer, melodica, rhythm arrangements 
 Dave Grusin – keyboards (8), ARP synthesizer (8)
 Louis Johnson – bass (1-7, 9, 10)
 James Jamerson – bass (8)
 Harvey Mason – drums
 Ralph MacDonald – percussion
 Ernie Watts – soprano saxophone (10)
 Paul Riser – horn and string arrangements 
 Tom Bahler – backing vocals
 Jim Gilstrap – backing vocals
 Augie Johnson – backing vocals
 Myrna Matthews – backing vocals 
 Caroline Willis – backing vocals

Production
 Bill Withers – producer 
 Larry Nash – producer
 Phil Schier – engineer
 Bob Merritt – assistant engineer 
 John Brogna – design 
 Ron Coro – design 
 Ed Caraeff – photography

Charts

Weekly charts

Year-end charts

Singles

External links
 Bill Withers-Making Music at Discogs

References

1975 albums
Bill Withers albums
Columbia Records albums